The 1999 Northern Ford Premiership season was the second tier of British rugby league during the 1999 season. The competition featured eighteen teams, with Dewsbury Rams finishing as league leaders and Hunslet Hawks winning the Grand Final.

Championship
The league was won by Dewsbury Rams. Dewsbury also reached the Grand Final, but lost to Hunslet Hawks, with Hunslet's Latham Tawhai winning the Tom Bergin Trophy. Hunslet were not promoted to the Super League however, as their stadium did not meet the minimum requirements to be accepted into the league.

League table

Play-offs

Week 1
Leigh Centurions 4–17 Featherstone Rovers

Hunslet Hawks 21–24 Widnes Vikings

Week 2
Dewsbury Rams 28–6 Widnes Vikings

Hunslet Hawks 17–9 Featherstone Rovers

Week 3
Hunslet Hawks 10–8 Widnes Vikings

Grand Final

See also
1999 Challenge Cup

References

External links

1999 season at wigan.rlfans.com

Rugby Football League Championship
Northern Ford Premiership